Parozodera chemsaki is a species of beetle in the family Cerambycidae. It was described by Huedepohl in 1985.

References

Trachyderini
Beetles described in 1985